The 2010 Southampton Council election took place on 6 May 2010 to elect members of Southampton Unitary Council in Hampshire, England. One third of the council was up for election and the Conservative Party stayed in overall control of the council.

Background
Before the election the Conservatives ran the council with 26 seats, compared to 14 for Labour and 8 for the Liberal Democrats. With the Conservatives defending just 4 of the 16 seats being contested they were almost certain to retain control of the council. Meanwhile, Liberal Democrat group leader Jill Baston was among those who stood down at the election, with former Liberal Democrat leader of the council Adrian Vinson attempting to return to the council in the seat she was leaving.

Election result
The results saw the Conservatives keep a majority on the council after gaining 2 seats to hold 28 of the 48 seats. Labour made a net gain of the 1 seat to move to 15 seats, while the Liberal Democrats lost 3 to be reduced to 5 councillors. With the election taking place at the same time as the 2010 general election overall turnout was higher than usual at 59%.

Both unsuccessful Conservative candidates for Southampton Itchen and Southampton Test in the 2010 general election were among those re-elected to the council. The former Liberal Democrat leader of the council Adrian Vinson, regained a seat on the council in Portswood, 2 years after being voted off the council, while Gerry Drake held Peartree for the Liberal Democrats by 30 votes after 3 recounts. However Labour candidates Keith Morrell and David Furnell gained the seats of Coxford and Millbrook respectively from the Liberal Democrats.

Ward results

Bargate

Bassett

Bevois

Bitterne

Bitterne Park

Coxford

Freemantle

Harefield

Millbrook

Peartree

Portswood

Redbridge

Shirley

Sholing

Swaythling

Woolston

References

2010 English local elections
May 2010 events in the United Kingdom
2010
2010s in Southampton